The Upland (Low German for Oberland "highland") is a low mountain region forming the northeastern part of the High Sauerland and belongs the German state of Hesse, unlike the remainder of the High Sauerland which lies in Westphalia. The Upland falls within the district of Waldeck-Frankenberg, in North Hesse and corresponds to the territory of the municipality of Willingen.

Geography 
The historic Upland lies in the southwestern area of the Diemelsee Nature Park at an average height of 500 to 700 m above NN. The northwestern and southwestern parts are almost entirely forested, whilst the centre, the area formally defined as a natural region called Upland (see below), only has islands of woods around some of the peaks.

Natural regions 
The historic Upland lies predominantly in the northwestern Rothaar Mountains mountain range with smaller elements also in the East Sauerland foothills. It incorporates the natural region of Upland, as well as the (northeastern) half of the natural region of Langenberg, which contains the highest peak in the Rothaargebirge, the 843,1 m high Langenberg, as well as other summits over 800 m high.

The following natural regions lie wholly or partly (see brackets) in the historic Upland:
 33 Süder Uplands
 332 East Sauerland Foothills
 332.6  (Fore Upland) Adorf Bay 
 332.60  Flechtdorf Höckerflur (extreme west only)
 333 Rothaar Mountains
 333.5  Winterberg Highland 
 333.58  Langenberg (northeast half) 
 333.8  Hochsauerland Schlucht Mountains
 333.82  Schellhorn and Treis Forests (extreme southeast) 
 333.9  Upland  
 333.90 Inner Upland (apart from the extreme north)
 333.91 Fore Upland Ridge (west and centre only)

Geology 
The soils of the Upland are based mainly on Upper Devonian marl, argillaceous shale and calcareous sandstone. This combination has produced good soils for arable farming. As a result, the forests were cleared very early on and replaced by wood pasture (the East Sauerland "mountain heaths").

Mountains 

The highest mountain in the Upland is the Langenberg, which is located immediately next to the border with neighbouring North-Rhine-Westphalia (and just on the Westphalian side). The almost equally high Hegekopf (842.9 m) lies opposite and entirely on Hessian territory.

Since autumn 2002 the Ettelsberg (837.7 m) has had an observation platform on the Hochheideturm with a height of 875 m.

Amongst the mountains of the Upland (including all the "eight hundreds") are those in the following list. They are sorted by height in metres above Normalnull (NN) (natural regions in italics; mountains on the state border with North Rhine-Westphalia are asterisked (*)): 
 Langenberg* (843.2 m) - Langenberg
 Hegekopf (842.9 m) - Langenberg
 Ettelsberg (837.7 m) - Langenberg with Hochheideturm
 Hopperkopf (832.3 m) - Langenberg
 Mühlenkopf (ca. 825 m) - Langenberg; with Mühlenkopfschanze
 Hoher Eimberg* (806.1 m) - Schellhorn and Treis Forests
 Hoppernkopf* (805.0 m) - Langenberg/Schellhorn and Treis Forests
 Mittelsberg (801 m) - Langenberg
 Hohe Pön (792,7 m) - Langenberg
 Krutenberg* (785.0 m) - Langenberg
 Dreiskopf* (781 m) - Schellhorn and Treis Forests
 Kahle Pön (775.3 m) - Inner Upland
 Emmet (742.5 m) - Langenberg
 Auf'm Knoll* (738 m) - Langenberg/Inner Upland
 Dommel (738.0 m) - Schellhorn and Treis Forests; with Dommelturm
 Sähre (726 m) - Inner Upland
 Iberg (720.5 m) - Inner Upland
 Osterkopf (708.5 m) - Inner Upland
 Orenberg (702 m) - Inner Upland

Rivers 
The Rhine-Weser watershed runs through the Langenberg natural region, beyond the western perimeter of the historic Upland. East of this the majority of the rivers drain into the Diemel and flow in a north to northeasterly direction. They are, from west to east (source regions in brackets):
 Hoppecke (Langenberg)
 Itter (Langenberg)
 Aarbach (Langenberg)
 Diemel (Inner Upland)
 Rhene (source on the Fore Upland Ridge, but outside the historic Upland)
Through the Fore Upland Ridge (Vorupländer Rücken), in a west-southwest to east-northeast direction, runs the watershed between the Diemel and the Eder, south of which the Neerdar rises in the Inner Upland, whose upper reaches flow through the southeast of the historic Upland.

Towns and villages 
 Heringhausen (Diemelsee)  is a recognized health resort. In 2023, the place has a 1000-year history.
 Willingen and its incorporated villages of Usseln, Schwalefeld, Rattlar, Eimelrod, Bömighausen, Hemmighausen, Neerdar and Welleringhausen.

References

External links 
  of the Upland with all important peaks / place marks

Natural regions of Germany
Regions of Hesse